This is a list of notable events in country music that took place in the year 1980.

Events 
 January 25 — At age 84, octogenarian comedian George Burns becomes by far the oldest performer (to that time) to have a single in the top 40 of Billboards Hot Country Singles chart with "I Wish I Was 18 Again." The song peaks at No. 15 in March.
 March 2 — The Public Broadcasting Company (PBS) telecasts the Grand Ole Opry for the third time, and this telecast lasts longer than any of the other telecasts. The telecast featured Tom T. Hall, Ronnie Milsap, Roy Acuff, Hank Snow, Minnie Pearl, Porter Wagoner, Billy Grammer, George Hamilton IV, Marty Robbins, and many others. Sissy Spacek also appeared on this telecast with Loretta Lynn, promoting the new movie Coal Miner's Daughter, which opened the next week.
 March — Alabama, a southern rock-influenced band from Fort Payne, Alabama, signs a recording contract with RCA Records, and records its first album, My Home's in Alabama. The album is released in May, and by late in the year, the band was on its way to superstardom.
 April 19 — For the first time in chart history, the top 5 positions on the Billboard Hot Country Singles chart are held (or co-held) by female artists. The list:
 "It's Like We Never Said Goodbye" by Crystal Gayle
 "A Lesson in Leavin'" by Dottie West
 "Are You on the Road to Lovin' Me Again" by Debby Boone
 "Beneath Still Waters" by Emmylou Harris
 "Two Story House" by Tammy Wynette (Duet with George Jones)
 July 5 — George Jones' classic "He Stopped Loving Her Today" reaches #1 on the Billboard Hot Country Singles charts.
 November 18 — The country-variety TV series, Barbara Mandrell and the Mandrell Sisters, debuts.

Country music goes Hollywood
 Country music had a major impact on the motion picture industry throughout the year, with no less than four major box office hits released during the year:
 March 7 — Coal Miner's Daughter, the biography of Loretta Lynn told in film, opens. Sissy Spacek wins that year's Academy Award for Best Actress for her portrayal of Lynn; Tommy Lee Jones and Beverly D'Angelo also play leading roles. The movie is a huge success with critics and at the box office, and briefly sparks Spacek's singing career.
 June 6 — The movie Urban Cowboy, starring John Travolta and Debra Winger, opens in American theaters. The movie — which showcases Mickey Gilley's nightclub, Gilley's — is a huge success at the box office ($54 million), and its soundtrack includes several major hits and makes stars out of several of the artists (most notably Johnny Lee), and will have a major impact on the direction of country music of the early 1980s.
 July 18 — Honeysuckle Rose, starring Willie Nelson, opens.
 December 19 — 9 to 5 – with Dolly Parton in one of the leading roles – opens.

Top hits of the year

Singles released by American artists

Singles released by Canadian artists

Top new album releases

Other top albums
{| class="wikitable sortable"
|-
! US
! CAN
! Album
! Artist
! Record Label
|-
| align="center"| 60
| align="center"| 
| After Hours
| Joe Stampley
| Epic
|-
| align="center"| 27
| align="center"| 
| Always
| Patsy Cline
| MCA
|-
| align="center"| 28
| align="center"| 
| Autograph
| John Denver
| RCA
|-
| align="center"| 43
| align="center"| 
| The Best of Chet on the Road — Live
| Chet Atkins
| RCA
|-
| align="center"| 34
| align="center"| 
| The Best of the Kendalls
| The Kendalls
| Ovation
|-
| align="center"| 64
| align="center"| 
| But What Will the Neighbors Think
| Rodney Crowell
| Warner Bros.
|-
| align="center"| 49
| align="center"| 
| Cactus and a Rose
| Gary Stewart
| RCA
|-
| align="center"| 71
| align="center"| 
| Changes
| Billy "Crash" Craddock
| Capitol
|-
| align="center"| 47
| align="center"| 
| Christmas with Slim Whitman
| Slim Whitman
| Cleveland Int'l.
|-
| align="center"| 29
| align="center"| 
| Dallas
| Floyd Cramer
| RCA Victor
|-
| align="center"| 51
| align="center"| 
| Don't It Break Your Heart
| Con Hunley
| Warner Bros.
|-
| align="center"| 45
| align="center"| 
| Double Trouble
| George Jones & Johnny Paycheck
| Epic
|-
| align="center"| 41
| align="center"| 
| Dreamlovers
| Tanya Tucker
| MCA
|-
| align="center"| 37
| align="center"| 
| Even Cowgirls Get the Blues
| Lynn Anderson
| Columbia
|-
| align="center"| 55
| align="center"| 
| Eyes
| Eddy Raven
| Dimension
|-
| align="center"| 26
| align="center"| 
| Family Bible
| Willie Nelson
| MCA
|-
| align="center"| 37
| align="center"| 
| Favorites
| Crystal Gayle
| United Artists
|-
| align="center"| 44
| align="center"| 
| Following the Feeling
| Moe Bandy
| Columbia
|-
| align="center"| 40
| align="center"| 
| The Game
| Gail Davies
| Warner Bros.
|-
| align="center"| 59
| align="center"| 
| Greatest Country Hits of the 70's
| Various Artists
| Columbia
|-
| align="center"| 61
| align="center"| 
| I Don't Want to Lose
| Leon Everette
| Orlando
|-
| align="center"| 29
| align="center"| 
| I Don't Want to Lose You
| Con Hunley
| Warner Bros.
|-
| align="center"| 27
| align="center"| 
| I'll Be There
| Gail Davies
| Warner Bros.
|-
| align="center"| 28
| align="center"| 
| I'll Need Someone to Hold Me When I Cry
| Janie Fricke
| Columbia
|-
| align="center"| 66
| align="center"| 
| I've Got Something to Say
| David Allan Coe
| Columbia
|-
| align="center"| 61
| align="center"| 
| In My Dreams
| Johnny Duncan
| Columbia
|-
| align="center"| 56
| align="center"| 
| Jerry Reed Sings Jim Croce
| Jerry Reed
| RCA
|-
| align="center"| 61
| align="center"| 
| John Anderson
| John Anderson
| Warner Bros.
|-
| align="center"| 35
| align="center"| 
| Killer Country
| Jerry Lee Lewis
| Elektra
|-
| align="center"| 26
| align="center"| 
| A Legend and His Lady
| Eddy Arnold
| RCA
|-
| align="center"| 59
| align="center"| 
| Love So Many Ways
| Ronnie McDowell
| Epic
|-
| align="center"| 61
| align="center"| 
| Many Moods of Mel
| Mel Street
| Sunbird
|-
| align="center"| 48
| align="center"| 
| New York Town
| Johnny Paycheck
| Epic
|-
| align="center"| 47
| align="center"| 
| New York Wine Tennessee Shine
| Dave Rowland & Sugar
| RCA
|-
| align="center"| 45
| align="center"| 
| No One Will Ever Know
| Gene Watson
| Capitol
|-
| align="center"| 69
| align="center"| 
| Oklahoma Rose
| Rex Allen, Jr.
| Warner Bros.
|-
| align="center"| 52
| align="center"| 
| Once a Drifter
| Charlie Rich
| Elektra
|-
| align="center"| 35
| align="center"| 
| One Man, One Woman
| Jim Ed Brown & Helen Cornelius
| RCA
|-
| align="center"| 37
| align="center"| 
| Only Lonely Sometimes
| Tammy Wynette
| Epic
|-
| align="center"| 70
| align="center"| 
| Standing Tall
| Billie Jo Spears
| United Artists
|-
| align="center"| 52
| align="center"| 
| A Sure Thing
| Freddie Hart
| Sunbird
|-
| align="center"| 30
| align="center"| 
| Take Me Back
| Brenda Lee
| MCA
|-
| align="center"| 43
| align="center"| 
| ''Texas Bound and Flyin
| Jerry Reed
| RCA
|-
| align="center"| 56
| align="center"| 
| There's Always Me| Jim Reeves
| RCA
|-
| align="center"| 26
| align="center"| 
| Together Again| George Jones & Tammy Wynette
| Epic
|-
| align="center"| 32
| align="center"| 
| When Two Worlds Collide| Jerry Lee Lewis
| Elektra
|-
| align="center"| 31
| align="center"| 
| Where Did the Money Go?| Hoyt Axton
| Jeremiah
|-
| align="center"| 28
| align="center"| 
| Who's Cheatin' Who| Charly McClain
| Epic
|-
| align="center"| 73
| align="center"| 
| Women Get Lonely| Charly McClain
| Epic
|}

On television

Regular series
 Barbara Mandrell and the Mandrell Sisters (1980–1982, NBC)
 Hee Haw (1969–1993, syndicated)
 Pop! Goes the Country (1974–1982, syndicated)
 The Porter Wagoner Show (1960–1981, syndicated)
 That Nashville Music (1970–1985, syndicated)

Specials

Births
April 1 – Kip Moore, country singer of the 2010s.
April 2 – Bobby Estell, radio personality of the 2010s-onward who uses the on-air name Bobby Bones and host of his eponymously named show.
July 3 – Sarah Buxton, singer-songwriter best known as co-writer of "Stupid Boy."
October 18 — Josh Gracin, rose to fame as fourth-place contestant on American Idol in 2003; had a string of hits thereafter ("I Want to Live," "Nothin' to Lose").

Deaths
 March 17 – Hugh Farr, 76, member of the Sons of the Pioneers.
 April 4 — Red Sovine, 62, best known for recitations of truck driving life (car accident resulting from a heart attack).
 June 16 – Bob Nolan, 72, member of the Sons of the Pioneers.

Country Music Hall of Fame Inductees
Johnny Cash (1932–2003)
Connie B. Gay (1914–1989)
Original Sons of the Pioneers (Roy Rogers 1911–1998, Bob Nolan 1908–1980, Lloyd Perryman 1917–1977, Tim Spencer 1908–1974, Hugh Farr 1903–1980 and Karl Farr 1909–1961)

Major awards

Grammy Awards
Best Female Country Vocal Performance — "Could I Have This Dance", Anne Murray
Best Male Country Vocal Performance — "He Stopped Loving Her Today", George Jones
Best Country Performance by a Duo or Group with Vocal — "That Lovin' You Feelin' Again", Emmylou Harris and Roy Orbison
Best Country Instrumental Performance — "Orange Blossom Special/Hoedown", Gilley's Urban Cowboy Band
Best Country Song — "On the Road Again," Willie Nelson (Performer: Willie Nelson)

Juno Awards
Country Male Vocalist of the Year — Murray McLauchlan
Country Female Vocalist of the Year — Anne Murray
Country Group or Duo of the Year — The Good Brothers

Academy of Country Music
Entertainer of the Year — Barbara Mandrell
Song of the Year — "He Stopped Loving Her Today", Bobby Braddock and Curly Putman (Performer: George Jones)
Single of the Year — "He Stopped Loving Her Today", George Jones
Album of the Year — Urban Cowboy, Soundtrack
Top Male Vocalist — George Jones
Top Female Vocalist — Dolly Parton
Top New Male Vocalist — Johnny Lee
Top New Female Vocalist — Terri Gibbs

Country Music Association
Founding President's Award (formerly Connie B. Gay Award) — Charlie Daniels
Entertainer of the Year — Barbara Mandrell
Song of the Year — "He Stopped Loving Her Today", Bobby Braddock and Curly Putman (Performer: George Jones)
Single of the Year — "He Stopped Loving Her Today", George Jones
Album of the Year — Coal Miner's Daughter'', Soundtrack
Male Vocalist of the Year — George Jones
Female Vocalist of the Year — Emmylou Harris
Vocal Duo of the Year — Moe Bandy and Joe Stampley
Vocal Group of the Year — The Statler Brothers
Instrumentalist of the Year — Roy Clark
Instrumental Group of the Year — Charlie Daniels Band

Further reading
Kingsbury, Paul, "The Grand Ole Opry: History of Country Music. 70 Years of the Songs, the Stars and the Stories," Villard Books, Random House; Opryland USA, 1995
Kingsbury, Paul, "Vinyl Hayride: Country Music Album Covers 1947–1989," Country Music Foundation, 2003
Millard, Bob, "Country Music: 70 Years of America's Favorite Music," HarperCollins, New York, 1993
Whitburn, Joel, "Top Country Songs 1944–2005 – 6th Edition." 2005.

References

Other links 
 Country Music Association
 Inductees of the Country Music Hall of Fame

External links 
Country Music Hall of Fame

Country
Country music by year